is a former Japanese association football player. He played for Mitsubishi Motors. He was the eleventh President of Japan Football Association from 2008 to 2010.

References
Japan Football Association

1942 births
Living people
Japanese footballers
Sportspeople from Saitama (city)
Association football midfielders